Brabants is a surname. Notable people with the surname include:

Jeanne Brabants (1920–2014), Belgian dancer and choreographer
Tim Brabants (born 1977), British sprint kayaker

See also
Brabant (disambiguation)